Saleh Said (also Romanized as Şāleḩ Saʿīd; also known as Şāleḩ Seyyed and ‘Ammār) is a village in Shavur Rural District, Shavur District, Shush County, Khuzestan Province, Iran. At the 2006 census, its population was 73, in 12 families.

References 

Populated places in Shush County